Simna is one of the 60 Legislative Assembly constituencies of Tripura state in India. It is in West Tripura district and is reserved for candidates belonging to the Scheduled Tribes. It is also part of Tripura West (Lok Sabha constituency).

Members of Legislative Assembly

Election results

2023

2018

See also
List of constituencies of the Tripura Legislative Assembly
 Tripura Legislative Assembly
 Mandaibazar (Vidhan Sabha constituency)

References 

West Tripura district
Assembly constituencies of Tripura